= English Harbour East Formation =

- Stratigraphic range: 575 – 542 Ma (Ediacaran)
- Type: Formation
- Unit of: Long Harbour Group

Lithology
- Primary: Mafic volcanics

Location
- Region: Newfoundland
- Country: Canada
- Occurrence of the English Harbour East Formation in southeastern Newfoundland

The English Harbour East Formation is a formation cropping out in Newfoundland.
